Richard T. Kelly (born 1970) is a British novelist and writer best known for his 2016 political thriller The Knives.

Career
Kelly began his career writing in film and wrote several film-related books. In 1998 he wrote Alan Clarke, a book on the filmmaker Alan Clarke. In 2000 he published The Name of this Book is Dogme 95, a look at the Danish film movement Dogme 95 created by Lars von Trier and Thomas Vinterberg. In 2004 he wrote an authorized biography of actor Sean Penn called Sean Penn: His Life & Times.

Kelly made his fictional debut with the 2008 novel Crusaders. Shortly after, in 2009, he began research on a political thriller that would develop into The Knives. His second novel The Possessions of Doctor Forrest followed in 2011. The Knives was published in 2016.

Since 2008 Kelly has been a Contributing Editor and feature writer for the UK edition of Esquire magazine.

Bibliography
Alan Clarke (1998)
The Name of this Book is Dogme 95 (2000)
Sean Penn: His Life & Times (2004)
Crusaders (2008)
The Possessions of Doctor Forrest (2011)
Our House, Your Home: The Past, Present and Future of Social Housing (2014)
The Knives (2016)
Keegan and Dalglish (2017)

References

External links
 
 

Living people
British male non-fiction writers
21st-century British novelists
1970 births
20th-century British non-fiction writers
21st-century British non-fiction writers
British biographers
British thriller writers